The Roman Catholic Diocese of Moroto is a diocese in the Ecclesiastical province of Tororo in Uganda.

History
 March 22, 1965: Established as Diocese of Moroto from the Diocese of Gulu

Leadership
 Bishops of Moroto (Latin Church)
 Bishop Sisto Mazzoldi, M.C.C.I. (1967.06.12 – 1980)
 Bishop Paul Lokiru Kalanda (1980.11.29 – 1991.06.17)
 Bishop Henry Apaloryamam Ssentongo (1992 – 2014)
 Bishop Damiano Giulio Guzzetti, M.C.C.I. (2014.05.24 - present)

See also
Roman Catholicism in Uganda
Moroto

References

Sources
catholic-hierarchy

External links
 GCatholic.org.com
 Catholic Hierarchy

Roman Catholic dioceses in Uganda
Christian organizations established in 1965
Roman Catholic dioceses and prelatures established in the 20th century
Moroto District
Roman Catholic Ecclesiastical Province of Tororo